Kler Heh (born 21 October 1996) is a Thai-Burmese former professional footballer who plays as a winger.

Born in a refugee camp near the Myanmar border in Tak Province, Thailand, he came through the youth system at Sheffield United before signing a professional contract. The 19-year-old Sheffield United winger was born and raised in a refugee camp for the Karen, a minority group facing oppression in Myanmar, before being resettled to Sheffield with his family under the British government's Gateway Protection Programme in 2006.

Early life
Kler Heh was born in a refugee camp on the Thailand-Myanmar border, to Karen parents from Myanmar. He was resettled in the UK with his family under the government's Gateway Protection Programme in 2006. In March 2015, he signed a professional contract to play for Sheffield United.

Club career
After signing his first professional contract with the Blades in Summer 2015, he joined Scottish Championship side Dumbarton on loan in January 2016. He made his senior debut as an 84th-minute substitute in a 1–0 victory over Livingston.

Heh joined Lithuanian I Lyga club DFK Dainava Alytus in March 2017 and became an important part of the team, before being signed by Latvian Higher League side FK Jelgava in the 2017 summer transfer window. In January 2018, he signed for FK Jonava.

International career
Kler Heh is eligible to represent Myanmar football team. In the summer of 2015 he announced that he would represent Myanmar internationally. The Myanmar Football Federation has stated that it is interested in having him play for the national team but that it would be difficult due to Myanmar's strict laws forbidding dual citizenship, in effect meaning that Heh would have to renounce his Thai and British passports to play for the national team.

References

External links

1996 births
Living people
Kler Heh
Kler Heh
English footballers
Kler Heh
Thai emigrants to the United Kingdom
English people of Karen descent
Association football wingers
English Football League players
Scottish Professional Football League players
Sheffield United F.C. players
Dumbarton F.C. players
FK Dainava Alytus players
Expatriate footballers in Scotland
Expatriate footballers in Lithuania
English people of Burmese descent